Pro domo is a 1918 Dutch silent drama film directed by Theo Frenkel.

Cast
 Louis Bouwmeester - Graaf Louis de Prébois Grancé
 Theo Mann-Bouwmeester - Graaf Louis de Prébois Grancé's wife
 Henriette Blazer - Danseres
 Lily Bouwmeester - Hun daughter
 Julius Brongers - Tuinman
 Jan Grader - Politieagent
 Coen Hissink - Jachtopziener
 Rika Hopper - Zuster Thérèse
 Julie Meijer - (as Julie Frenkel-Meyer)
 Bertus Onstee - Priester
 John Timrott - Henri de Beaucourt
 Annie Wesling - Gouvernante
 Ernst Winar - Prins

External links 
 

1918 films
Dutch silent feature films
Dutch black-and-white films
1918 drama films
Films directed by Theo Frenkel
Dutch drama films
Silent drama films